Alari Kivisaar (born 16 January 1967 in Tartu) is an Estonian television personality and nature photographer, best known as the host of the game show Võta või jäta.

References

1967 births
Living people
Estonian television personalities
Estonian television presenters
Estonian game show hosts
Estonian photographers
People from Tartu
20th-century Estonian people